"American Made" is a song written by Bob DiPiero and Pat McManus, and recorded by American country music group The Oak Ridge Boys.  It was released in February 1983 as the first single and title track from the album American Made.  The song was The Oak Ridge Boys' seventh number one on the country chart.  The single went to number one for one week and spent a total of thirteen weeks on the country chart.  "American Made was also one of their biggest cross-over hits peaking at number seventy-two on the Hot 100.

Content
In the song, the narrator laments over so many other items that he needs for daily living being foreign made with foreign sounding names but is happy that his "baby" isn't this but instead is what the song's title says, "from her silky long hair to her sexy long legs".

Chart performance

In popular culture
"American Made" was later made into a TV commercial jingle for Miller Beer, with the line in the song's chorus being changed from "My baby is American made" to "Miller's made the American way."

References

The Oak Ridge Boys songs
1983 singles
Songs written by Bob DiPiero
Song recordings produced by Ron Chancey
MCA Records singles
1983 songs
Songs written by Pat McManus (songwriter)